A Friend of the Family may refer to:
 A Friend of the Family (novel)
 A Friend of the Family (TV series)
 A Friend of the Family (film)